Lost Girl is a Canadian supernatural drama television series  that premiered on Showcase on September 12, 2010. The series was created by Michelle Lovretta and is produced by Jay Firestone and Prodigy Pictures Inc., with the participation of the Canadian Television Fund (Canada Media Fund), and in association with Shaw Media. It follows the life of a bisexual succubus named Bo, played by Anna Silk, as she learns to control her superhuman abilities, help those in need, and discover the truth about her origins.

On February 28, 2013, Showcase renewed Lost Girl for a fourth season consisting of thirteen episodes, with production starting in the spring. Season Four premiered November 10, 2013, with its Sunday night broadcast changed from a 9 p.m. to 10 p.m. time slot.

In the United States, Syfy announced on the same date the renewal for a fourth season to begin in 2014. On November 22, 2013, Syfy announced the January 13, 2014, premiere of Season Four, with the show's Monday broadcast schedule changed from 10 p.m. to 8 p.m. 
On January 23, 2014, Syfy announced that the series' broadcast was returning to 10 p.m. (effective Episode 4.03 on January 27, 2014). The January 16, 2014, premiere of Season Four in the United Kingdom and Ireland on Syfy (UK) was announced on December 17, 2013. On February 5, 2014, Syfy (UK) announced that the time slot for the show had been changed from 10 p.m. to 9 p.m., effective immediately.

Plot
While Kenzi, Hale, and Dyson, are all living their lives, Bo is nowhere to be found. It's later realized that they simply forgot Bo, as someone was forcing them to. Massimo has been giving Kenzi temporary powers to appear Fae. Bo finally awakens to find herself on a train, and later jumps off. A group of Fae called the "Una Mens" are introduced. When she arrives home, it is discovered that while Bo herself did not consciously choose a side, her blood has chosen Dark. Tamsin is found reborn, as a little girl, and grows up with Kenzi as her pseudo-mom. Massimo steals from Bo and Kenzi in an attempt to convince Kenzi to pay him, and Bo figures out that he is not Fae, but human. He also kidnaps Tamsin to acquire her Valkyrie hair, and after being defeated by Bo, chases after the hair into a pit of lava, where at that point he is presumed to be dead. Many of Trick's secrets and past actions are revealed, including a tie to a past life of Tamsin's, and the fact that he used his blood to "erase" someone from existence. Tamsin discovers that by not taking the soul of a man named Rainer to Valhalla, she is part of the reason "The Wanderer" was created. Bo is able to get back on the train, where she finally meets Rainer, and brings him back to the Dal. Hale and Kenzi admit their feelings for each other.  Lauren, who has been working with the Dark, somehow turns the Morrigan human. Kenzi's mother is introduced, and Hale attempts to propose. Massimo returns, and protecting Kenzi, Hale is killed. Kenzi tries to get revenge, but is stopped by Vex, who mentions that he is Massimo's guardian. Evony is revealed to be Massimo's mother, and gave him to Vex years ago when he was a boy. Bo learns that not only is her father coming, but that to close the portal, she will need to give her heart. That is revealed to be Kenzi, who sacrifices herself. It ends with Bo visiting Kenzi's grave.

Cast and characters

Main cast 
 Anna Silk  as Bo
 Kris Holden-Ried  as Dyson
 Ksenia Solo  as Kenzi
 Zoie Palmer  as Dr. Lauren Lewis 
 Rick Howland  as Fitzpatrick "Trick" McCorrigan
 K. C. Collins  as Hale Santiago

Recurring cast
 Emmanuelle Vaugier as Evony Fleurette Marquise: The Morrigan
 Paul Amos as Vex: a Mesmer
 Rachel Skarsten as Tamsin: a Valkyrie
 Tim Rozon as Massimo: The Druid.
 Christine Horne as The Keeper: the inquisitor of The Una Mens.
 Kyle Schmid as Rainer: a rebel Fae.
 Ali Liebert as Crystal: a waitress at the diner Lauren worked in while in hiding.
 Mia Kirshner as Clio: an Elemental Nymph.
 Rob Archer as Bruce: a bodyguard and hatchet man for The Morrigan (species unknown).
 Inga Cadranel as Aife: a Succubus and Bo's birth mother.

Production
Midway through Season Three, Showcase announced the renewal of Lost Girl for a fourth season on February 28, 2013, citing consistent delivery of "stellar ratings" and a "cornerstone series" for the network. Later on the same day, Syfy announced it had renewed Lost Girl for a fourth season containing thirteen episodes, and premiering in 2014.

On May 31, 2013, Prodigy Pictures and Showcase announced that filming had begun on thirteen episodes for Season Four, with an expected premiere in Fall 2013; followed with a start of production announcement by Syfy on June 4, 2013.

Showcase announced its 2013 Fall schedule on July 11, 2013, with Season Four premiering on November 10, 2013, and its Sunday night broadcast changing from a 9 p.m. to 10 p.m. time slot.

As a lead-in to the premiere of Season Four, Showcase announced the streaming of a four-part original web series on the Lost Girl website, with the first episode released on October 13, 2013.

On November 22, 2013, Syfy announced the January 13, 2014, premiere of Season Four, with the show's Monday broadcast schedule changed from 10 p.m. to 8 p.m.

On January 23, 2014, Syfy announced that the series' broadcast was returning to 10 p.m. (effective Episode 4.03 on January 27, 2014).

Broadcast special
The premiere of Season Four was preceded by Lost Girl: An Evening at the Clubhouse, a one-hour special featuring cast-on-cast interviews, webisode footage and a sneak peek. During the pre-show, cast reflected on both the past and upcoming seasons, revealed behind-the-scenes stories, and responded to fan questions.

Episodes

Notes

Webisodes
A series of four webisodes were created as a promotional lead-in to the premiere of Season Four on Showcase, with the first installment announced on October 11 two days before its release. They are collectively described as "SEASON 3.5".

Reception and popularity 
In an exclusive selection of the best Canadian television shows of 2013, Lost Girl was rated "Number 6" by some of Canada's top critics and television editors in Canada's Best in Show by TV Guide (Canada).

HuffPost Canada TV ranked Lost Girl as the "Number 4" television show in its Best Canadian TV Of 2013.

In the annual AfterEllen Visibility Awards, Lost Girl, Lauren Lewis, and Zoie Palmer won the categories in which they were candidates for year 2013.

At the 2014 Canadian Screen Awards, Lost Girl won the Fan Choice Award for Favourite Canadian Show and Zoie Palmer won the Fan Choice Award for Favourite Canadian Screen Star.

Home media release
The Season 4 DVD and Blu-ray for Region 1 (Canada and U.S.) was released by Giant Ape Media (Funimation SC) on June 24, 2014.  In the United Kingdom and Ireland (Region 2), Sony Pictures Home Entertainment released the DVD of Season 4 on May 19, 2014.

References

External links
 
 Lost Girl at  Syfy (U.S.) 
  Lost Girl at Prodigy Pictures Inc.  
 Lost Girl at Canadian Television Fund  
 
 
 Lost Girl list of episodes at Garn's Guides
 Lost Girl at BO SERIES INC. (Giant Ape Media)

Season
2013 Canadian television seasons
2014 Canadian television seasons